Anomognathus is a genus of beetle belonging to the family Staphylinidae.

The genus was first described by Solier in 1849.

The species of this genus are found in Europe and Northern America.

Species:
 Anomognathus cuspidatus (Erichson, 1839)

References

Aleocharinae
Staphylinidae genera